Army Men: World War - Team Assault is a third-person shooter video game developed by American studio 5000ft Inc. and published by The 3DO Company for PlayStation.

References

External links

2001 video games
Army Men
Multiplayer and single-player video games
PlayStation (console) games
PlayStation (console)-only games
Video games developed in the United States